Armudlu is a village in the Qubadli District of Azerbaijan.

References

Populated places in Qubadli District